The Saint Sava Serbian Orthodox Church was originally established February 14, 1914, in Gary, Indiana, US, and is now located in Merrillville, Indiana, after the consecration of the new church building in 1991. It is the church-school congregation in which Saint Varnava, the first American-born Serbian to be proclaimed an Orthodox saint, was baptized, served as altar boy, and was first recognized as a youthful prodigy in reciting Serbian folklore and old ballads.

It is recognized as being among "10 Beautiful Region Cathedrals and Churches" in Northwest Indiana and one of the Midwest's oldest parishes, founded by early Serbian settlers in the United States seeking to establish their local community with the building of a church to help maintain their traditional customs.

Through its religious and nationalistic endeavors, it earned the renowned name of "Srpska Gera". It is now among the churches in the Northwest Indiana region that enjoy the status of institutional landmarks.

Architectural design and recognition

Design model 
The architectural design of the exterior central portion of the current St. Sava church building was modeled in the Byzantine architecture style after the Oplenac, a Serbian Orthodox Church located in Topola, Serbia. The central part of the church structure shares many similarities in its physical features and likeness to the Oplenac.

Gold Medal Award 
Upon completion of construction of the main structure in 1990, the Illinois Indiana Masonry Council honored St. Sava Serbian Orthodox Church with the Gold Medal Award for Excellence in Masonry Design citing the work of Architect Radovan Pejovic and Mason Contractor Gacesa Masonry Construction.

Physical attributes 
The church can accommodate as many as 500 people.

The steel beams that form the skeleton of the building structure enable the expansive central part of the church to exist open and barrier free. The steel beams were made in two Lake County, Indiana, steel plants, Inland Steel and U.S. Steel.

The north wing of the building complex holds administrative offices, a custodian's apartment, and originally a library which was intended at the time of the church consecration and has since been converted into a museum organized by the St. Sava Historical Society. The lower level of the north wing houses the Sunday School classrooms. The south wing was originally designed to house classrooms with movable partitions when the church was built, but has since been converted into a small hall with built-in kitchen and bar facilities available for rental known as the South Wing Social Center.

The exterior facade of the building is Indiana limestone from Bedford, Indiana, and the interior of the church is mainly constructed from Appalachian red wood.

The giant chandelier in the center of the church and several others are of German crystal designed and custom-made in a New York plant.

Interior iconography 
All the original iconography lining the walls are the work of Orthodox priest Theodore Jurewicz.

Jurewicz painted the Virgin Mary and the Christ child over the center altar in 1991 over a period of two months. He later returned and painted “The Nativity of Christ” icon on the north wall, taking two weeks to compete it in March 1993. It was consecrated May 30, 1993.

Later that year, Jurewicz painted “The Resurrection of Christ and Descent into Hades” icon on the south wall, taking two weeks to complete it in May 1993. It was consecrated March 27, 1994.

Jurewicz also painted the icon mural in the choir loft on the west concave apse of the church where the Serbian Singing Society Karageorge sings during services. The mural depicts twelve saints that are important to the Orthodox faith, intertwined with a history rich with religious and political significance. The choir loft mural was painted by Jurewicz in November 1993. This icon was consecrated December 12, 1993 (the Karageorge Choir's Slava of St. Andrew) with Bishop Lavrentje from Sabac-Valjevo Diocese and Father Jovan Todorvich.

The icon depicting “righteous souls going into paradise - cursed souls on their way to hell” was painted in the church vestibule by Jurewicz and his two sons in August 1999.

The icon of the Guardian Angel above the dressing table for those to be christened is located in the christening area in the northwest corner of the church.

Exterior mosaic iconography 
There are 36 mosaics, 34 of them completely visible from the exterior and two of them visible on the north and south entrances of the main church visible from within the atrium enclosures. The mosaics were made possible through the donations from 23 individuals who donated $125,300 toward the project.

These religious mosaics are deemed to be iconographic in nature even though the techniques and materials used by the artist differ from the painted icon. All the mosaics were created by Marchione Studios of Canton, Ohio.

Over the main entrance is an icon of Christ as the Head of the Church, and an icon of Saint Sava, the Patron Saint of the Church. Above the south door of the church, in the atrium, is the icon of Saint Simeon, Saint Sava's father. In the atrium, over the north door, is Saint Lazar, the sainted hero of Kosovo.

Above the doors that link the church to the two wings, on the west side, are icons of two courageous warriors of Christ, who guard the north and south entrances. Over the north atrium door is the mosaic of the Great Martyr Saint Demetrius. Mosaics on the east side atrium doors depict the two representatives of the heavenly body with Saint Archangel Michael to the north and the Angel of Resurrection from the Monastery Mileseva to the south.

At the west end of the north wing exterior is the American crest depicting an eagle and the seal of the United States of America, with the inscription, "God Bless America." On the exterior of the south wing's west wall is the Serbian crest with the inscription "God saves Serbs." These crests reflect the congregation's faith in the Lord Jesus Christ, the Orthodox Church, and in the national heritage.

The remainder of the mosaics on both wings depict the following monasteries, churches, and individuals:

South wing mosaics (west side) 
 Studenica Monastery
 Hilandar Monastery
 Zica Monastery
 Oplenac Monastery
 King Peter I

South wing mosaics (east aide) 
 Patriarchate of Pec Monastery
 Saint Naum of Ohrid Monastery
 Saint Sava Monastery (Libertyville, Illinois) – This mosaic depicts Saint Sava Serbian Orthodox Monastery in the United States, the first monastery on the North American continent. It was built in 1931 by Mardarije Uskokovich, the first bishop of the American-Canadian Diocese. The exterior is in the Russian style and the interior in the Serbian-Byzantine. It considered by many to be the most important religious, educational, and national center for the entire American-Serbian population. It played a special role in bringing and settling Serbian immigrants in the post-World War II years. It serves as a diocesan seat.
 Saint Sava Church (Gary, 1939) – This mosaic depicts the church that stood at the corner of 13th and Connecticut in Gary, a new church center necessitated by the fast growth of the membership.
 Saint Sava Church (Gary, 1915) – This mosaic depicts the church that Serbians in Gary built in 1915 at the corner of 20th and Connecticut streets in Gary.

South wing mosaics (south side) 
 Draza Mihailovich
 Maiden of Kosovo
 Karageorge

North wing mosaics (west side) 
 Mileseva Monastery
 Gracanica Monastery 
 Decani Monastery
 New Gracanica Monastery
 King Alexander I

North wing mosaics (east side) 
 Cetinje Monastery
 Krka Monastery
 Gomirje Monastery
 Tvrdos Monastery
 Krusedol Monastery

North wing mosaics (north side) 
 Michael Pupin
 Jovan Ducic
 Nikola Tesla

History

Early years (1912-1920) 
The Saint Sava Serbian Orthodox Church-School Congregation began with a large population of Serbian people who settled in the Gary area and served an important role in maintaining the Serbian culture while also helping Serbian immigrants adapt to mainstream America.

In 1912, before any official church congregation was established, a group of Serbians in Gary founded the first Serbian School at 14th and Massachusetts Streets. The first teacher of the school was Paul Veljkov, who later became a priest and would be the second priest to serve the St. Sava Church-School Congregation after it officially formed in 1914.

The Serbian Orthodox Church-School Congregation of St. Sava was established February 15, 1914, in Gary and adopted and ratified the first by-laws of the church on March 22, 1914, at the Main Membership Assembly for efficient and successful realization of its aims and purposes.

The Serbian Orthodox Church-School Congregation of St. Sava was founded as a community of persons who profess the Orthodox Faith and reside in one or more localities which comprise a geographical or administrative unit. For legal purposes, the St. Sava Church-School Congregation was originally incorporated on April 16, 1914.

The first church building was founded and consecrated on June 13, 1915, at 20th and Connecticut streets in Gary. Godfather for its dedication was Michael Pupin, who donated $300 and was represented by John Matanovich. Through the leadership of Father Peter Stijachich and executive board president John Marich the mortgage was liquidated quickly.

Among its parishioners were 450 volunteers who were recruited during World War I to fight with the Allies in Serbia. Serbia's highest award for heroism was given to Jovo Sever and Risto Vajagich, with Vajagich leading the nine Vajagich brothers in action.

1920s 
At the beginning of the 1920s, internal provincial divisiveness within the congregation was so great that it led to a division. Even the Circle of Serbian Sisters, an auxiliary organization of the church, split. A second parish, known as Holy Resurrection, was founded at 39th and Washington Streets in the Glen Park section of Gary.

Because living conditions changed, the membership of the St. Sava Church-School congregation amended its by-laws at an annual meeting on March 7, 1927.

In 1929, Bishop Mardarije Uskokovich from the Saint Sava Monastery in Libertyville, Illinois, blessed the ground where the new St. Sava Church would be built at the corner of 13th and Connecticut Streets in Gary.

1930s and 1940s 
Following a unification of the split that occurred within the congregation in the early 1920s, the parish built "one of the most Serbian of Churches and centers on this continent" in the late 1930s due to the need for a larger facility that was more centrally located. In 1937, the cornerstone for the new church was blessed by Bishop Iriney Djordjevich, administrator of the American-Canadian Diocese at the time.

Bishop Damaskin Gradanicki served the rite of consecration for the newly completed church building November 24, 1938. The godfather of the event, Nikola Tesla, was represented by Michael Duchich. With construction and consecration complete, the congregation moved north from its original church building to Its new location. The former church property was sold in 1939 after the move.

The church mortgage for the new building was retired in 1943.

The congregation gave up nine of its sons to World War II, and two more in the Korean War. The parish was vigorously engaged in bringing immigrants to Gary during the post-war years.

In 1949, with may young people drifting away from the church, the church president Nick Sever proposed to the church board the idea of starting an English speaking Sunday School with laymen teachers under the guidance of the church priest.

1950s 
In 1955, the congregation purchased  on 49th Avenue in Hobart, Indiana, where it would ultimately build a picnic grounds and a large hall facility that would serve the congregation for decades. In 1956, the debt for the picnic grounds was retired and the facility was officially blessed.

The congregation again amended its by-laws on December 23, 1956, this time at an Extraordinary Membership Meeting.

When the State of Indiana changed its laws for church and religious organizations on March 3, 1943, the congregation was reincorporated on June 14, 1957.

In 1958 the school board of St. Sava Church received permission to construct and operate the concession stand at the church picnic grounds to supplement the expansion of Sunday School activities.

By the end of the 1950s the St. Sava Serbian Orthodox Church-School Congregation was recognized as the largest Eastern Orthodox Church in Gary.

1960s 
In the beginning of the 1960s, a portion of the membership separated itself from the congregation at St. Sava to form the Macedonian Orthodox Church and a religious and cultural center was established in Crown Point, Indiana.

In 1961, the Church and School Board, recognizing their responsibilities with the growth of the Sunday School, hired Dusan Bunjevich, a theological student, as the School Superintendent of the Sunday School and the Serbian School to direct the school curriculum with the parish priest. This made St. Sava Church in Gary at the time the only Serbian colony in the United States with a fully paid qualified School Superintendent. Later, on July 4, 1964, Bunjevic was ordained a deacon in Jackson, California, and then on August 9, 1964, he was ordained a priest at St. Sava Serbian Orthodox Church.

In 1963, a schism at the highest levels of the Serbian Orthodox Church resulted in the defrocking of Bishop Dionisije and a division among the Serbian Orthodox faithful in diaspora. What followed was a bitter conflict with attendant lawsuits in civil courts for nearly three decades. Locally, this schism also resulted in a portion of the membership separating from the St. Sava Church-School Congregation and forming the new congregation of St. Elijah, which established a church and cultural center in Crown Point.

Also in the early 1960s, the parish priest of St. Sava Church, Hieromonk Petar Bankerovic, later Bishop of Australia-New Zealand, was attacked and viciously beaten outside the church, which left him with physical impairments for the rest of his life.

Gary Mayor A. Martin Katz proclaimed Sunday, November 15, 1964, as "St. Sava Serbian Church Day" in Gary in honor of the Easter Orthodox church's 50th anniversary of its founding in the City of Gary. The church hosted a banquet program that featured Col. Nick T. Stepanovich, counsel for the Free Eastern Orthodox Diocese of America and Canada.

In 1969, the newly constructed hall was officially dedicated.

1970s 
In 1970, the mortgage for the hall on 49th Avenue in Hobart was retired.

In 1971, the State of Indiana changed its laws for church and religious organizations once again, necessitating the congregation's reincorporation on February 27, 1974.

Also in 1971, the congregation purchased a parish home at the corner of 53rd and Carolina Street in Merrillville, Indiana.

The second building of the congregation, dedicated in 1939, was destroyed by a fire in the late afternoon and early evening of February 16, 1978. The entire church complex including every church item, a large library, an administrative office, a social hall, caretakers quarters, the Parish Priest Home and furnishings were all lost, with the exception of the Holy Relics.

Without any lapse in the Church's liturgical services, worship resumed the following Sunday after the fire, February 19, 1978, when Bishop Iriney brought new Antimins (a Corporal - a silk cloth portraying the Body of Jesus Christ being placed into the Tomb) and gave His blessing so that the Divine Liturgy could be celebrated on an ordinary table covered with a plain cloth in the Saint Sava Serbian Hall on 49th Avenue in Hobart.

In the weeks following the fire, the small hall at the facilities in Hobart was completely converted into a chapel in less than 45 days under the supervision of Peter Erkman and Dragan Adamovich during the presidency of Zivojin Cokic of the church executive board. The small chapel would continue to be the spiritual center for the church until the consecration of the new church building in 1991 in Merrillville, Indiana.

During the excavation of the ruins of the church building in Gary, three youths, Louis Milicich, Steven Baroevich, and John Derado, found the remains of the Holy Corporal in which the Holy Relics, which had been sewn into the Holy Corporal by the Bishop, were found intact. Also at the excavation, Radmila Milivojevich, president and member of the Circle of Serbian Sisters at St. Sava, found the undamaged metal box which contained the Holy Relics placed in the Holy Table by the Bishop at the consecration of the church in 1938.

At the Annual Membership Meeting February 26, 1978, the Congregation resolved, "...to find a suitable construction site, inquire about the price, review the environment, and learn all details pertinent to building a new church."

Upon the recommendation of the Executive Board, the Extraordinary Membership Assembly voted on April 8, 1978 "...to purchase  of land at 9191 Mississippi Street in Merrillville at a cost of $6,000 per acre for a total cost of $833,712 with an 8% annual interest on the loan. President Zivojin Cokic and the executive board signed the contract with Guaranteed Life Insurance Company and placed a deposit on June 9, 1978. Stevan and Zagorka Micic voluntarily guaranteed the terms of the contract using their personal collateral.

1980s 
With President Cokic and the Executive Board, along with the work of Finance Chairman Nicholas Chabraja and all subordinate organizations and personnel, the loan for the property was liquidated in 19 months. On the Slava Day of St. Sava Sunday, January 27, 1980, the mortgage on the Mississippi Street land was burned.

In 1982, the membership of the congregation approved a building program at the Mississippi Street properly.

Due to an increase in membership and the number of duties including successful progress and added administrative needs in the Church-School Congregation, the Extraordinary Membership Assembly accepted and affirmed new by-laws on May 16, 1982.

Members of the 1982 By-laws Committee were Steve Boljanich, Chairman; Very Rev. Fr. Jovan Todorovich, Secretary; Nick Chabraja, Member (Past President); Nick Sever, Member (Past President); Zivojin Cokic, Member (Past President). The president of the Executive Board of the church at the time was Joe Sever and the secretary of the Executive Board was Alexander Churchich The by-laws for the congregation were approved by Bishop Irinej at The Most Holy Mother of God Monastery in Third Lake, Illinois, on January 31, 1983. Those by-lays are still in effect as of 2016.

On Sunday, June 5, 1983, the executive board of St. Sava chose the precise spot for the construction site on 9191 Mississippi Street and the Diocesan Bishop Rt. Rev. Iriney was invited to bless the ground and place a wooden cross.

The contract for Milojko Perisich, the first architect named to the new building project, was approved September 13, 1983. However, architect Perisich died December 28, 1983 requiring the search for a new architect to complete the project. Radovan Pejovic, the architect who would complete the building project for the new church, was approved May 7, 1984.

The groundbreaking ceremony for the new church was held on July 31, 1985. The foundation of the new church was consecrated in 1987. The bells of the church were consecrated and installed in 1988, and the five crosses at the tops of the domes of St. Sava Church were consecrated and installed in 1989.

1990s 
The chapel in the Saint Sava Serbian Hall in Hobart served as the primary location of liturgical services from the time of the fire until the consecration of the new church building on May 18, 1991. The Kumovi of the Church at the Consecration Ceremony were Glisho Rapaich and Mike and Yvonne Galich. Serbian Patriarch Pavle served Divine Pontifical Liturgy at St. Sava Church in Merrillville.

In 1999 St. Sava's new "Spomenik" Monument was placed near the south end of the south wing of the main church building. The monument honors all wars since 1389 Kosovo and was donated by Mile and Ella Kosanovich.

2000s 
The St. Sava Church-School Congregation celebrated its 90th anniversary on November 14, 2004.

In 2005, Bishop Varnava was canonized as Saint Varnava (Barnabas). He had been the first altar boy at St. Sava Church when it was located in Gary.

In 2007, the St. Sava Serbian Historical Society was established to preserve ethnic culture and history. Also in February 2007, the Very Reverend Stavrophor Jovan Todorovich retired as priest and Father Marko Matic began serving the congregation.

In 2009, the old Veteran's Monument from former site of St. Sava Church in Gary was moved to the church grounds in Merrillville by the Sever family and volunteers.

2010s 
St. Sava Serbian Orthodox Church honored St. Varnava during a service on November 11, 2010, at the church. Rev. Thomas Kazich, with the Serbian Midwest Diocese of North America, and the Rev. Marko Matic, a priest at St. Sava Church, were involved in the service.

The St. Sava Church-School Congregation launched its first social media presence with an official Facebook Page and their first posting October 25, 2011.

In April 2014, representatives from the St. Sava Church-School Congregation presented preliminary plans to the Town of Merrillville Board of Zoning Appeals for the construction of a cemetery. The Special Exemption approval was granted by the board in April 2014 and later approved at the Town Council meeting in May 2014.

In November 2014, the congregation celebrated the 100th anniversary of the church. The festivities included a full weekend of events which took place in the newly completed Pavilion, a contemporary venue that serves as a central meeting place for the congregation to host large-scale cultural events, and is also available for rental to the general public for weddings, business conferences, tradeshows, and other local events requiring a large-scale venue space.

Crown Prince Alexander and Crown Princess Katherine of Serbia made their first visit to St. Sava Serbian Orthodox Church on September 30, 2016. They participated in a prayer in the church, toured an exhibit created by the St. Sava Church Historical Society, viewed a performance by the St. Sava Church Children's Choir, and then attended a special humanitarian fundraising banquet taking place in the event center at St. Sava Church.

On November 12, 2016, Bishop Longin, along with visiting clergy, presided over the groundbreaking ceremony for the new Orthodox Cemetery at St. Sava Church. Earth-moving equipment was on-site and construction began in the weeks following the ceremony.

November 12, 2016, was also a date that saw two other significant events, in the history of the church. In the weeks leading up to this date, a major floor refinishing project took place in the main church in which all of the wood floors throughout the church were refinished and carpet in the altar was replaced. The replacement of the carpeting in the Altar required moving of all the items in the altar, including the Holy Relics on the Holy Table which was the first time the items were had been moved since the consecration of the church 25 years earlier. Bishop Longin blessed the church, enabling services to resume in the sacred space. Bishop Longin also elevated Father Marko Matic to the rank of Stavrophor in the Orthodox Church on November 12, 2016. This is the highest rank for an Orthodox priest serving a parish.

2020s 
In response to the government of Montenegro seeking to confiscate Serbian Orthodox Church lands, Holy Sites, and Holy Relics, all Serbian Churches in Northwest Indiana joined in a peaceful demonstration (Litija) and a special service (Moleban) in a show of support for their brothers and sisters in Montenegro, protecting their Holy Sites.

Bishop Longin and Bishop Metodije from Montenegro, with local clergy, led those in attendance in prayer and a 4-mile solemn walk of protest from St. Sava Serbian Orthodox Church to St. Elijah Serbian Orthodox Cathedral in Merrillville.

Present day 

During the interim years of 1978 through 1991, while the Liturgy was still being performed in the Chapel, the priest and the church board undertook plans to finance and erect what would be a "once-in-a-lifetime endeavor" constructing the "church of our dreams", which was consecrated in 1991 and home to the Church-School Congregation as of present day.

In November 2014 the church was able to complete construction of the new Pavilion in time to celebrate the 100th anniversary of the church.

One of the most striking features of the Pavilion is the unique use of full-length, floor-to-ceiling accordion-style window/doors which line the length of the main exterior walls of the large central assembly area, offering seamless transition from the comfort of the central hall to the beauty of the outside environment. These accordion window/doors provide access to the two large patio areas that exist for additional outdoor event space usage which face scenic wooded areas towards the back side of the pavilion facility.

The contemporary venue is available for rental to the general public for weddings, business conferences, tradeshows, and other local events requiring a large-scale venue space, but it also serves as a critical central meeting place for the congregation to host large-scale cultural events such as the annual "Serb Fest" which takes place each summer and other special events throughout the year like the Lenten Fish Frys, the youth folklore group's annual Intercultural Dance Festival, or the Children's Choir Festival hosting youth choral talent from around the midwest.

Official languages 
The official languages of the Saint Sava Serbian Orthodox Church-School Congregation are Serbian (Cyrillic Alphabet) and English; and the liturgical languages are Church-Slavonic, Serbian, and English.

Aim of the congregation 
The purposes of the Saint Sava Serbian Orthodox Church-School Congregation are, according to its by-laws:
 to protect, preserve and perpetuate the true teaching of the Orthodox Faith, together with all Serbian traditions and customs;
 to accept persons into the Holy Orthodox Faith through Holy Baptism and to guide them into family life through marriage according to the teachings and traditions of the Church;
 to, through appropriate teaching, edify the believers towards spiritual and moral perfection, to foster mutual brotherly love and unity, and to mold worthy and loyal citizens of these United States of America,
 to erect and maintain a church and all appurtenant annexes pertinent to the spiritual, cultural, educational, national, athletic and social needs of its faithful;
 to establish and maintain Church and Serbian Schools and to help organize programs for the spiritual and moral upbringing of the children and youth;
 to preach and practice charity as a high ideal of our Christian religion;
 to preserve our ancestral tradition of interring members of our church who depart this life;
 to cooperate and maintain good relations with other church-school congregations within our Diocese of New Gracanica and Midwestern America

Priests 
The following have served as priests at St. Sava Church since its founding.
 Reverend Dushan Bogich
 Reverend Paul Veljkov
 Reverend Milan Jugovich
 Reverend Philip Sredanovich
 Reverend Paul Veljkov
 Reverend Petar Stijachich
 Reverend Bogoljub Gakovich
 Reverend Paul Markovich
 Very Reverend Dushan Shoukletovich
 Reverend Vladmir Mrvichin
Reverend Nikola Sekulich
 Very Reverend Svetozar Radovanovich
 Very Reverend Dushan Shoukletovich
 Very Reverend Stavrophor Velimir Petakovich
 Bishop Peter Bankerovich (served from 1963–1970)
 Very Reverend Stavrophor Jovan Todorovich (served from 1970–2007)
 Very Reverend Stavrophor Marko Matic (served from 2007–present)

Church Board presidents 
The following have served as president of the executive board at St. Sava Church since its founding.

 Bozo Trbovich - November 1913 to March 1914
 Glisho Rapaich - March 1914 to September 1914
 Stevo Orlich - September 1914 to June 1915
 Petar Pritza - July to December 1915
 Jovo Marich - 1916
 Luka Grkovich - 1917
 Marko Lukach - July 1917
 Stevo Orescanin - 1917 to 1921
 Djuro Milijanovich - 1921; 1938 to 1942
 Krsto Bratich - 1922
 MIhailo Ducich - September 1923 to August 1926
 M. B. Mihailovich - September 1926 to 1928
 B. T. Martinovich - 1928
 Jefto Wuletich - 1930 to 1937
 David Bundalo - 1943 to 1955
 Rudy Tatalovich - 1956 to 1959
 Nick Chabraja - 1960 to 1962; 1971 to 1973
 Nick Sever - 1963 to 1970; 1974 to 1976
 Zivojin Cokic - 1976 to 1982
 Joe Sever - 1982 to 1984
 Gordon Gerbick - 1984 to 1987
 Theodore Erceg - 1987 to 1993
 Michael Galich - 1993 to 2005
 Dennis Svilar - 2006 to 2011
 Yvonne Orlich - 2012
 Mihajlo Ajder - 2013 to 2015
 Danica Pejnovic - 2016 to 2019
 Tony Settele - 2020 to present

Connection with Saint Varnava (Barnabas) the New Confessor 
Saint Varnava was the first American-born Serbian to be proclaimed an Orthodox saint during the 2005 regular session of the Holy Assembly of Bishops of the Serbian Orthodox Church when he was canonized and his name was added to the list of saints of the Serbian people and of Orthodox Christian faith. Born with the secular name Vojislav Nastic in Gary, Indiana, in 1914, he lived with his family in a home near 12th Avenue and Madison Street and was the first person baptized at St. Sava Serbian Orthodox Church when it was located in Gary, where he also served as an altar boy.

In 1921 his family moved back to their homeland. In 1937, he graduated first in his class and was quickly appointed a catechist in Sarajevo. Upon taking monastic vows in 1940 under the name of Varnava, he was ordained a hierodeacon.

A play was written and produced in January 1965 at St. Sava Serbian Orthodox Church in Gary, Indiana about Bishop Varnava, "Martyr to Communism," and was acted in the church auditorium by children to acquaint them with his life and death. The author of the play was Daisy Wuletich, Gary-born, who had visited Bishop Varnava when he was living in Serbia, drew upon her personal letters of the Bishop, from an account of the trial, and her personal observations.

Saint Sava Serbian Orthodox Church maintained connection with Varnava throughout his life. More than 40 years before Varnava was canonized as a Saint, St. Sava Serbian Orthodox Church sought his release from the Tito regime which had imprisoned Varnava in 1948 for preaching against the Communist way of life in Yugoslavia. It was hoped that Varnava would be released and able to return to the United States for the 50th anniversary of the Church in 1964. However, his release was not granted and he was not able to attend.

Orthodox cemetery 
In April 2014, representatives from the St. Sava Church-School Congregation presented preliminary plans to the Town of Merrillville Board of Zoning Appeals for the construction of a Cemetery. The Special Exemption approval was granted by the Town of Merrillville Board of Zoning Appeals in April 2014 and later approved at the Town Council meeting in May 2014.

In January 2016, the Executive Board of the St. Sava Church-School Congregation voted to approve members of the Cemetery Board. The board will help to guide the Rules and Regulations of the new Cemetery and provide certain types of guidance and support as preparations for construction begin to take shape in 2016.

On November 12, 2016 Bishop Login, along with visiting clergy, presided over the groundbreaking ceremony for the new Orthodox Cemetery at St. Sava Church. Earth moving equipment was on-site and construction officially began in the weeks following the ceremony. At the time of the groundbreaking it was estimated that the initial construction efforts to prepare the land would be completed in Spring 2017.

Historical Society and museum 
The church maintains a museum in the north wing of the church building complex that is organized by the Historical Society of St. Sava Serbian Orthodox Church and is open to the public during special events and by appointment.

The society has featured exhibits through the years highlighting Serbs in the Steel Mills, Serbian Weddings, Serbian Sisters Circle, Serbs in Sports, Serbs in the Military, and other traveling exhibits. Members of the Historical Society also help maintain a special section of the museum dedicated to the Karageorge Choir of St. Sava Serbian Orthodox Church, which is located in the choir loft in the central part of the church.

Notable church sponsors 
 Professor Mihajlo Pupin was a sponsor for the consecration of the first church building of St. Sava Serbian Orthodox Church when it was located at 20th and Connecticut Streets in Gary.
 Inventor Nikola Tesla was a sponsor for the consecration of the second church building of St. Sava Serbian Orthodox Church when it was located at 13th and Connecticut Streets in Gary, Indiana.

Notable members 
 Saint Varnava (Barnabas) the New Confessor (Serbian: Свети Варнава Нови Исповједник), also known as Varnava of Hvosno was auxiliary bishop of Hvosno and is a saint of the Eastern Orthodox Church. His feast is October 30 on the Julian calendar.
 Steve Barich (1923 – October 24, 1995) was a 2011 Tamburitza Association of America Hall of Fame Inductee (posthumously).
Walt Bogdanich is an American investigative journalist and three-time recipient of the Pulitzer Prize.
Nicholas Chabraja is an American lawyer and former Chief Executive Officer of General Dynamics Corporation.
 Jovan Dučić (Duchich) (February 17, 1871 – April 7, 1943) was a Bosnian Serb poet, writer and diplomat who moved to Gary, Indiana and promoted Serbian causes through literature and other means.
 Ted Erceg in 2008 was honored by Indiana Governor Mitch Daniels with the "Distinguished Hoosier Award."
Milo Komenich (June 22, 1920 – May 25, 1977) was an American professional basketball player.
 Karl Malden (born Mladen George Sekulovich; March 22, 1912 – July 1, 2009) was an American actor.
Stevan Mićić is a Serbian-American freestyle and folkstyle wrestler who competes at 57 kilograms (125 pounds) and represented Serbia in the 2020 Olympic Games.
 Milan Opacich (April 12, 1928 – January 21, 2013) was a Tamburitza instrument maker, 2002 Tamburitza Association of America Hall of Fame Inductee, and a 2004 National Heritage Fellowship Awardee. He was widely regarded as the lay historian for the Serbian community in the greater Gary area.
 Lou Stefanovic was selected by the Seattle Supersonics in the fifth round of the 1985 NBA Draft. His six-year European pro career included a stint with Red Star, a top club in the Serbian capital of Belgrade. He is also in the Illinois State University Athletics Hall of Fame.
 Sasha Stefanovic, son of Lou Stefanovic, is a Serbian-American professional basketball player. He played college basketball for the Purdue Boilermakers. After going undrafted in the 2022 NBA draft, Stefanovic joined the San Antonio Spurs for the 2022 NBA Summer League.
Nicholas Strincevich (March 1, 1915 – November 11, 2011) was an American Major League baseball player.
 Olga Velazquez in 2006 was the first woman elected mayor of Portage, Indiana.
Sam Vudis inducted into the Tamburitza Association of America - Hall of Fame in 2007.

References

External links 
 

Eastern Orthodoxy in Indiana
Serbian Orthodox church buildings in the United States
Serbian-American history
Church buildings with domes
Churches completed in 1991
Churches in Lake County, Indiana
Merrillville, Indiana